The Indonesian Maritime Security Agency is a maritime patrol and rescue agency of the Republic of Indonesia. Bakamla is a non-ministerial government institution which reports directly to the President through Coordinating Ministry for Political, Legal, and Security Affairs. Bakamla's duty is to conduct security and safety patrols in the territorial waters of Indonesia and the jurisdiction of Indonesia. Previously Bakamla was a non-structural institution called the Coordinating Agency for the Security of the Republic of Indonesia. The agency is not part or associated with the Indonesian National Armed Forces, although its top-ranking leadership are handpicked from the Indonesian Navy. Bakamla and the Indonesian Navy, however, often conduct exercises and joint-operation together. While during search-and-rescue operations, Bakamla also conduct joint-operations with the National Search and Rescue Agency.

President Joko Widodo officially announced the establishment of Bakamla to coincide with the 2014 Nusantara Day celebration held in Kotabaru, South Kalimantan. During the occasion, the President mentioned that Bakamla would be coordinated by the Coordinating Minister for Politics, Law and Security. Meanwhile, in the management and utilization of marine resources, Coordinating Minister for Political and Security Affairs would coordinate with the Coordinating Minister for the Ministry of Maritime Affairs.

Bakamla is not associated with the Indonesian Sea and Coast Guard Unit. While the former is under the jurisdiction of the Coordinating Ministry for Political, Legal, and Security Affairs, the latter is under the jurisdiction of the Ministry of Transportation. Both of them however has similar roles and functions.

History
Maritime Security Coordinating Board  initially had been formed in 1972 through a joint decree of the Minister of Defense and Security / Commander of the Armed Forces, Ministry of Communications, Ministry of Finance, Minister of Justice and Attorney General, No. KEP/B/45/XII/1972; SK/901/M/1972; KEP.779/MK/III/12/1972; J.S.8 /72/1; KEP-085/J.A/12/1972 on the Establishment of Marine Safety Coordinating Board and the Joint Command Operations Marine Safety.

Due to changes on governance and development of the strategic environment in 2003, Maritime Security Coordinating Board requires refreshment to improve coordination among various government agencies in the field of maritime security. Hence, Coordinating Minister for Political and Security Affairs issued decree, No. KEP.05 / Menko / Polkam / 2/2003, of establishment of a working group Development Planning security and Law Enforcement at Sea. And through a series of seminars and cross-sectoral coordination meeting, then on 29 December 2005, it was determined the Presidential Decree No. 81 Year 2005 on Maritime Security Coordinating Board as the legal basis of the Maritime Security Coordinating Board.

Following the enactment of Article 59 (3) Law No. 32 Year 2014 concerning the Marine, Bakorkamla officially renamed the Maritime Security Agency or Badan Kemananan Laut (Bakamla). Legal basis for Bakamla was then reinforced by the issuance of Presidential Decree No. 178 of 2014 on Maritime Security Agency.

Before 2022, there are multiple maritime law enforcement agencies in Indonesia which tend to have overlap authority between one another in the maritime zone of the country. On March 2022, the government issue new regulation to designate Bakamla as coordinating body for all maritime law enforcement agencies.

Although Bakamla has always referred to itself as Indonesian Coast Guard, through its insignia on uniforms, assets and social medias. There are no regulation or law that explicitly state that Bakamla as a "coast guard". The latest regulation in 2022 only refer Bakamla as the "Agency".

Function 
The task of Bakamla is to conduct security and safety patrols in the territorial waters of Indonesia and the jurisdiction of Indonesia.

 Establish national policies in the field of security and safety in the territorial waters of Indonesia and the jurisdiction of Indonesia;
 Organize security and safety early warning systems in Indonesian waters and jurisdiction areas;
 Carry out safeguards, supervision, prevention and prosecution of law violations in the territorial waters of Indonesia and the jurisdiction of Indonesia;
 Coordinate and monitor the execution of water patrol with relevant agencies;
 Provide technical and operational support to related institutions;
 Provide search and rescue assistance in the territorial waters of Indonesia and the territory of Indonesian jurisdiction;

According to Article 63 Law No. 32/2014 on Marine Affairs, Bakamla has the authority to:
 conduct an immediate pursuit; 
 dismiss, examine, arrest, carry, and deliver vessels to relevant authorities for further legal process execution; and 
 synergize the information system of security and safety in the territorial waters of Indonesia and the jurisdiction of Indonesia.

Vision and Mission 
 To be Professional and trustworthy maritime security agency in both national and international maritime community to support the creation of a sovereign, independent and personality based on mutual cooperation.
 To create National and International maritime security capable of maintaining security and safety in the territorial waters of Indonesia and the jurisdiction of Indonesia and reflecting the personality of Indonesia as an archipelago country.
 To protect sovereignty of Indonesia, independent and strengthen identity as a maritime country through Bakamla as the guardian of the world maritime axis.
 The realization of developing Indonesia into an independent maritime nation, strong forward and based on the national interest.

Organisation

According to presidential decree No. 178/ 2014, the organisation structure of the BAKAMLA comprises the following components:

 Head of Bakamla
 Law Enforcement Unit
 Inspectorate
 Task Forces
 Secretary of Bakamla
 Bureau of Planning and Organization
 Bureau of General Affairs
 Bureau of Infrastructure
 Deputy of Information, Law and Cooperation.
 Directorate of Data and Information
 Directorate of Law
 Directorate of Cooperation
 Deputy of Operation and Training
 Directorate of Naval Operation
 Directorate of Naval Aviation Operation
 Directorate of Training
 Deputy of Policy and Strategy
 Directorate of Marine Security Policy
 Directorate of Marine Security Strategy
 Directorate of Marine Security Research and Development
 Head of Western Maritime Zone Office
 Head of Central Maritime Zone Office
 Head of Eastern Maritime Zone Office

Academy 
The Marine Safety and Security Academy is the main training institute for Bakamla candidates. The academy is located within the area of Naval Doctrine, Education, and Training Development Command, Bumimoro, Surabaya. The AKKL (Marine Safety and Security Academy) is a breakthrough of Bakamla in preparing qualified human resources in the field of marine security and marine education for three years.

AKKL is paramilitary academy and its graduates will get diploma certificate, the establishment of AAKL is due to cooperation between Bakamla and the Navy. AKKL's campus is located inside the Kodiklatal for Dormitory and Classroom, and the early warning system skill laboratory is located at Naval Academy (AAL) Bumi Moro, Moro Krembangan, Surabaya. The requirements to become AKKL cadets are as followse: male with age 22 years or below, high school graduate,  physically and mentally fit, proven to have good behaviour and passed the selection test.

Operational areas 
The operational area of Bakamla is the Indonesian Maritime Zone which is divided into three maritime zones:
 Western Maritime Zone - Headquartered in Batam, Riau Islands. This maritime zone oversees areas of western Indonesia such as the islands of Java, Sumatra and Kalimantan.
 Central Maritime Zone - Headquartered in Manado, North Sulawesi. This maritime zone oversees areas of central Indonesia such as Sulawesi and the Lesser Sunda Islands.
 Eastern Maritime Zone - Headquartered in Ambon, Maluku. This maritime zone oversees areas of eastern Indonesia such as Maluku and Papua.
In the future, Bakamla will increase the base or maritime zone spread over Indonesian waters by building seven more maritime zones to support the marine security sector. Seven maritime zones to be built in North Sumatra, West Sumatra, Cilacap, Makassar, Balikpapan, Natuna, Sorong, and Merauke. Each maritime base will have long-range radar stations and satellites to support operations. In addition, it will also be equipped with surveillance equipment and information from the satellite, which can monitor anyone entering Indonesian waters.

Equipment

Vessels
All of the vessels are currently built domestically

Weaponry 
Bakamla personnel equipped with Canik TP9 9mm handgun, DSAR15PC 5.56mm assault rifle, DSSR762 7.62mm marksman rifle and 12.7mm machine gun. Bakamla vessels also have been authorized to use 30 mm caliber autocannon.

Rank structure
The Bakamla uses a similar ranking system and insignia with Indonesian Navy. The difference between navy and Bakamla rank are the usage of special title (Bakamla uses special title of "BAKAMLA" for every personnel, while navy uses "(TNI)" for high-ranking officer and branch/corps abbreviation for other officer and enlisted personnel) and Bakamla does not have a rank higher than a Vice admiral as that is the rank of the head of the agency. Indonesian National Armed Forces personnel, Indonesian National Police personnel or other civil servant who are assigned to Bakamla are given Bakamla rank which are correspond to his/her original rank.

References

External links 

 Bakamla Official Website

Coast guards
Law enforcement agencies of Indonesia